Guba may refer to:

 Guba (surname)
 Quba, Azerbaijan, a city also spelled as Guba and Kuba
 Guba River, a river near Indwe, Eastern Cape, South Africa
 Guba (woreda), a woreda in Ethiopia
 Cyclone Guba, a 2007 tropical cyclone in Australasia
 Gubguba, also known as guba, an Indian percussion string instrument
 a Hungarian prehistoric coat made of coarse knotted cloth
 a mourning chant sung by guests at an ancient Irish Aonach
 Ghana UK-Based Achievement Awards (GUBA Awards), an annual British award that recognises the contributions of British-Ghanaians to society

See also
 Guba Koricha, a woreda in Ethiopia
 Guba Lafto, a woreda in Ethiopia